Sir Arthur Charles, Speaker of the Leglsiative Council of Aden, was assassinated on 1 September 1965, during the Aden Emergency.

Charles was shot as he was entering his car after playing at the Sierra Tennis Club in Crater. He was immediately taken to a hospital, but died there. Charles had been in Aden since 1959 and was knighted in June 1965.

References

Aden Emergency
September 1965 events in Asia
1965 in the Federation of South Arabia
Assassinations in Yemen
1965 murders in Asia